Anticheta brevipennis is a species of fly in the family Sciomyzidae. It is found in the  Palearctic

References

External links
Images representing Anticheta at BOLD

Sciomyzidae
Insects described in 1846
Muscomorph flies of Europe